The 2012 Kremlin Cup was a tennis tournament played on indoor hard courts. It was the 23rd edition of the Kremlin Cup for the men (17th edition for the women) and was part of the ATP World Tour 250 Series of the 2012 ATP World Tour, and of the Premier Series of the 2012 WTA Tour. It was held at the Olympic Stadium in Moscow, Russia, from 13 October through 21 October 2012. Andreas Seppi and Caroline Wozniacki won the singles title.

ATP singles main-draw entrants

Seeds

 Seeds are based on the rankings of October 8, 2012

Other entrants
The following players received wildcards into the singles main draw:
  Evgeny Donskoy
  Teymuraz Gabashvili
  Andrey Kuznetsov

The following players received entry from the qualifying draw:
  Evgeny Korolev
  Konstantin Kravchuk
  Édouard Roger-Vasselin
  Michael Berrer

Withdrawals
  Tobias Kamke
  Mikhail Kukushkin 
  Lu Yen-hsun

ATP doubles main-draw entrants

Seeds

 Rankings are as of October 8, 2012

Other entrants
The following pairs received wildcards into the doubles main draw:
  Evgeny Donskoy /  Igor Kunitsyn
  Teymuraz Gabashvili /  Andrey Kuznetsov

WTA singles main-draw entrants

Seeds

 Seeds are based on the rankings of October 8, 2012

Other entrants
The following players received wildcards into the singles main draw:
  Margarita Gasparyan
  Elena Vesnina
  Caroline Wozniacki

The following players received entry from the qualifying draw:
  Vesna Dolonc
  Anastasia Rodionova
  Valeria Solovieva
  Elina Svitolina

Withdrawals
  Marina Erakovic
  Sara Errani (left thigh injury)
  Kaia Kanepi
  Aleksandra Wozniak

WTA doubles main-draw entrants

Seeds

1 Rankings are as of October 8, 2012

Other entrants
The following pair received wildcard into the doubles main draw:
  Anastasia Frolova /  Margarita Gasparyan

Finals

Men's singles

 Andreas Seppi defeated  Thomaz Bellucci, 3–6, 7–6(7–3), 6–3

Women's singles

 Caroline Wozniacki defeated  Samantha Stosur, 6–2, 4–6, 7–5

Men's doubles

 František Čermák /  Michal Mertiňák defeated  Simone Bolelli /  Daniele Bracciali, 7–5, 6–3

Women's doubles

 Ekaterina Makarova /  Elena Vesnina defeated  Maria Kirilenko /  Nadia Petrova, 6–3, 1–6, [10–8]

References

External links
 

Kremlin Cup
Kremlin Cup
Kremlin Cup
2012 in Russian tennis
2012 in Moscow
October 2012 sports events in Russia